Chebucto may refer to:

Geography
 A Mi'kmaq word for Halifax Harbour in Nova Scotia, Canada, meaning "Chief Harbour" or "big harbour"; rendered in Mi'kmaq orthography as Kjipuktuk
 Chebucto Head, Nova Scotia, a headland in Nova Scotia
 Chebucto Lake, northern Ontario
 Chebucto Peninsula, Nova Scotia

Ships
 Point Chebucto, a tug built at Halifax Shipyard
 Chebucto (ferry), a former ferry in Halifax Harbour

Other
 Halifax Chebucto, an electoral district
 Chebucto Community Network